Baldwinella is a genus of marine ray-finned fish from the grouper and sea bass family Serranidae. It was created in 2012 and the name honours Carole C. Baldwin of the Division of Fishes at the National Museum of Natural History, recognised her contribution to the study of the Serranidae.

Species
There are two species classified within the genus Baldwinella:

 Baldwinella aureorubens (Longley, 1935) (Streamer bass)
 Baldwinella vivanus (Jordan & Swain, 1885) (Red barbier)

References

Anthiinae